TER Alsace was the regional rail network serving the région of Alsace, eastern France. In 2016 it was merged into the new TER Grand Est.

Network

Rail

Road

 Cernay – Sewen
 Colmar – Turckheim – Munster – Metzeral
 Colmar – Volgelsheim
 Haguenau – Niederbronn – Bitche
 Haguenau – Obermodern-Zutzendorf – Saverne
 Ingwiller – Wimmenau – Lichtenberg
 Mommenheim – Obermodern-Zutzendorf
 Sarrebourg – Réding
 Sarre-Union – Sarrebourg
 Frohmuhl – Obermodern-Zutzendorf – Saverne
 Sélestat – Sainte-Marie-aux-Mines – Saint-Dié
 Obermodern-Zutzendorf – Bouxwiller

Rolling stock

Multiple units
 SNCF Class Z 11500
 SNCF Class Z 27500
 SNCF Class X 73500
 SNCF Class X 73900 (generally used on lines to Germany)
 SNCF Class X 76500
 SNCF Class B 82500

Locomotives
 SNCF Class BB 25500
 SNCF Class BB 26000
 SNCF Class BB 67400

Future

The TER Alsace continues its development. Some old lines will be opened again, and new trains have been ordered (Alstom Régiolis) and will be delivered in 2013–2014.

At the same time, the region is currently putting in place Alséo, a magnetic card allowing access not only to the urban transport networks of Strasbourg, Colmar and Mulhouse, but also the TER network.

Tram-train
The Thur valley tram-train, between Mulhouse and Thann, began operation in December 2010 with Siemens Avanto rolling stock.

A tram-train between Strasbourg, Molsheim and Barr has also been proposed but won't be realized before 2018

See also

SNCF
Transport express régional
Réseau Ferré de France
List of SNCF stations in Alsace
Alsace

References

External links
 Official Site (SNCF)
 Official Site (Région)

 
TER